The Solution is a soul band that was formed by the American Scott Morgan (Sonic's Rendezvous Band) and Swede Nick Royale (from The Hellacopters and Entombed) after previously working together in the rock n roll band The Hydromatics.

History
The origins of the band comes from when Nick Royale of The Hellacopters and Tony Slug from punk band Nitwitz planned to recorded a series of Sonic's Rendezvous Band cover songs. The project never got started due to hectic schedules, but when The Hellacopters toured in America Tony Slug set up a meeting with Scott Morgan and soon The Hydromatics were born. The band released the album "Parts Unknown" and the live recording "Fluid Drive", Nick was then forced to leave the band due to his responsibilities with his main project The Hellacopters.

Despite Nick's departure from The Hydromatics, Scott and Nick kept in touch and Morgan recorded vocals for some of The Hellacopters' covers of Sonic's Rendezvous Band songs. In 2004 Morgan traveled to Stockholm, Sweden, to record the debut album of "Soulmover" in  Atlantis Studio together with Nick and a new lineup of Swedish musicians. Before the release of the album, the name was changed to "The Solution". The result was "Communicate!", released in 2004 on the label Wild Kingdom Records. The record contained originals written by both Scott and Nick as well as covers from artists such as Curtis Mayfield and Tony Joe White’s and soon gained good reviews. After a short tour to Sweden the band's members went back to their other projects and it wasn't until 2007 that they once again teamed up for their second album.

"Will Not Be Televised" was released on December 27, 2007, on Psychout Records and contained original work as well as covers of artist Albert Kings, Staple Singers and Loretta Lynn. In December Nick and Scott participated in "Soul Folks", a two night tribute show organized by Sulo from The Diamond Dogs. Nick and Scott performed alongside several famous Swedish musicians such as: Papa Dee, Pernilla Andersson, Clarisse Muvemba as well as Matte Lagerwall and Ingemar Wallén from The Boppers.

Members
Scott Morgan - lead vocals, guitar, harmonica
Nicke Andersson - drums, percussion, guitar, backing vocals
Henke "The Duke of Honk" Wilden - piano, organ
Jim Heneghan - bass guitar
Mattias Hellberg - rhythm guitar, lead guitar
Linn Segolson - backing vocals
Clarisse Muvemba - backing vocals
Cecilia Gärding - backing vocals
Jennifer Strömberg - backing vocals
Linnea Sporre - backing vocals
Gustav Bendt - saxophone
Emil Strandberg - trumpet

Discography

Albums
2004 - Communicate! - LP/CD
2007 - Will Not Be Televised - CD
2008 - Will Not Be Televised - LP

Singles
2004 - I Have To Quit You / I'll Be Around - 7" single
2004 - My Mojo Ain't Workin' No More / My Mojo Ain't Workin' No More (live) - 7" single
2008 - The Solution / Powertrane - 7" split single

External links
The Solution at MySpace
Official Site
Scott Morgan - The Solution
Scott Morgan The Solution Tour Diary

American soul musical groups
Musical groups from Michigan
2004 establishments in Michigan